Vasili Vladimirovich Pukirev (Russian: Василий Владимирович Пукирев; 13 December [O.S. 1 December] 1832 – 13 June [O.S. 1 June] 1890) was a Russian genre painter in the Realistic style.

Biography 
He was born to a peasant family and was originally apprenticed to an icon painter in Mogilev. By sheer luck, he was able to enroll at the Moscow School of Painting, Sculpture and Architecture (MSPSA), where he studied from 1847 to 1858 under the direction of Sergey Zaryanko and Apollon Mokritsky. After 1850, he was certified to serve as an art teacher in the public schools. In 1855 he was awarded the title of "Artist" and, in 1858, became a "Free Artist".

In 1860, he became an "Academician" for history and portrait painting. He settled in an apartment near the MSPSA and taught there through 1873. In 1869, he collaborated with Alexei Savrasov to prepare a drawing course for use in the public schools. In addition to his paintings, he created icons and illustrations for the works of Gogol and Turgenev.

Four years later, he was forced to give up teaching due to poor health. In 1879, his fellow artists got together to provide him with a modest pension, but he died in poverty and nearly forgotten in 1890.

The Unequal Marriage
His best known painting is "The Unequal Marriage". Pukirev appears at the far right of the canvas (possibly as best man), giving rise to the story that it represented an episode of lost love in his own life. In 1863, on the basis of this work, he was named an honorary Professor at the Imperial Academy of Fine Arts. It also spawned a heated debate in the press, with his supporters praising it for presenting a serious theme from modern life, unlike the usual genre scenes, which tended to be nostalgic or sentimental. It is currently on display at the Tretyakov Gallery.

Works

References

External links 

Biography, quotes and extensive list of paintings from the Russian Biographical Dictionary @ Russian WikiSource.
"The Unequal Marriage" an appreciation of the painting at "Zhivopis".
"The Unequal Marriage" a video presentation by the Tretyakov Gallery @ YouTube (10:24 minutes, Russian)

19th-century painters from the Russian Empire
Russian male painters
1832 births
1890 deaths
Russian genre painters
People from Tula Governorate
Russian illustrators
19th-century male artists from the Russian Empire
Moscow School of Painting, Sculpture and Architecture alumni